Wyatt Worthington II (born 1987) is an American professional golfer.

Worthington is from Reynoldsburg, Ohio and works in Gahanna, Ohio.

Worthington is a graduate of Groveport Madison High School and Methodist University.

Worthington qualified for the 2016 PGA Championship by finishing sixth at the 2016 PGA Club Professional Championship, becoming the second African-American qualifier for the PGA Championship via that route. The previous African-American qualifier was Tom Woodard at the 1991 PGA Championship.

Worthington is a member of the Southern Ohio section of the PGA.

Results in major championships

CUT = missed the half-way cut
Note: Worthington only played in the PGA Championship.

U.S. national team appearances
PGA Cup: 2022 (winners)

References

External links

American male golfers
African-American golfers
Golfers from Ohio
People from Reynoldsburg, Ohio
1987 births
Living people
21st-century African-American sportspeople